The Grevemberg House is a historic mansion in Franklin, Louisiana, U.S.. It was built in 1851, a decade prior to the American Civil War. It was designed in the Greek Revival architectural style. It has been listed on the National Register of Historic Places since June 6, 1980.

The house is located in Franklin's City Park, on Sterling Road.  It was moved to this location.

References

External links
Official website

Houses on the National Register of Historic Places in Louisiana
Greek Revival houses in Louisiana
Houses completed in 1851
Houses in St. Mary Parish, Louisiana
Antebellum architecture